Ruleta de la Muerte (1998) was a professional wrestling pay-per-view event produced by Consejo Mundial de Lucha Libre (CMLL) that took place on July 18, 1998 in Palacio de los Deportes, Mexico City, Mexico. The show featured the Ruleta de la Muerte¨(Spanish for "Roulette of Death") tournament, in which tag teams face off in a single elimination tournament, but unlike traditional tournaments it is the losing team that advances in the tournament. The losing team in the final match must wrestle each other in a Lucha de Apuestas match, where either their mask or their hair is on the line. The Tournament featured 16 teams, most of them created for the tournament. The show featured no additional matches outside the 15 tournament matches and the Lucha de Apuesta match.

Background
The event featured 16 professional wrestling matches with different wrestlers involved in pre-existing scripted feuds or storylines. Wrestlers portray either villains (referred to as Rudos in Mexico) or fan favorites (Técnicos in Mexico) as they compete in wrestling matches with pre-determined outcomes.

Results

References

1998 in professional wrestling
Consejo Mundial de Lucha Libre shows
Events in Mexico City